Formosa Airlines Flight 7613 was an aviation accident that killed six people on 5 April 1996 in Beigan, Matsu Islands, Fujian, Taiwan.

Accident 
The aircraft, a Dornier 228-212 (registration B-12257), crashed on approach to Beigan Airport in poor visibility. All 17 occupants survived the initial impact, but six passengers drowned. Both crew members and the remaining eight passengers survived.

Investigation 
The flight crew had failed to monitor the aircraft's altitude and improperly opened the aircraft's emergency exits, causing the aircraft to fill with water.

References 

Aviation accidents and incidents in Taiwan
Airliner accidents and incidents caused by pilot error
Aviation accidents and incidents in 1996
Airliner accidents and incidents involving controlled flight into terrain
1996 disasters in Taiwan